Phạm Đình Duy (born 2 April 2002) is a Vietnamese professional footballer who plays as a winger for V.League 1 side SHB Đà Nẵng and the Vietnam national team.

Club career 
Đình Duy was promoted by SHB Đà Nẵng's manager Phan Thanh Hùng to first team for the 2022 season. He made his debut on the team's first league match of the season against Sài Gòn, entering on the 56th minute.

International career 
On 21 September 2022, Đình Duy made his debut for Vietnam national football team in the 4–0 win against Singapore, replacing Phạm Tuấn Hải in the start of the second half.

Career statistics

Club

Notes

International

Honours
Vietnam
VFF Cup: 2022

References

2002 births
Living people
Vietnamese footballers
Association football forwards
V.League 1 players
SHB Da Nang FC players